Holy Hill Basilica and National Shrine of Mary, Help of Christians is a Roman Catholic shrine in the north central United States, dedicated to the Blessed Virgin Mary. The centerpiece of the shrine is a minor basilica. It is located in the town of Erin, near Hubertus, Wisconsin, in the Roman Catholic Archdiocese of Milwaukee. The shrine has approximately 300,000 visitors per year.

Location

History
Tradition says that the hill was first discovered by Europeans  in 1673 by Father Jacques Marquette with Louis Jolliet. However, modern historians view this tradition as untrue, though Jesuits were likely the first Catholic priests to set foot on the hill.

The U.S. government owned the land until 1855, and the hill was known as "Government Hill" because surveying work was done there. Forty acres were purchased by Fr. Paulhuber of Salzburg, Austria.

The first white resident of the hill was a hermit named François Soubrio. Around 1862, an area farmer found him living on the hill. Soubrio had heard about the hill when he was working as an assistant to a retired professor in Quebec, Canada. He had found an old French diary and map dated 1676 showing a cone-shaped mountain in Wisconsin. The diary described how the author placed a stone altar, raised a cross, and dedicated the hill to Jesus's mother Mary. The diary account corresponds with Jesuit missionary work in the area between 1673 and 1679.

The name "Holy Hill" was first given to the place by Irish settlers in the area. Father George Strickner dedicated a log chapel as the first Shrine of Mary, Help of Christians on May 24, 1863. A set of wooden crosses were placed for the Stations of the Cross in 1875. In the winter of 1879, Fr. Raess sent a proposal to Archbishop John Henni to construct a new shrine to Mary. Construction began that spring. Pilgrims began flocking to the shrine, and it was decided that a religious order should administer the shrine. A group of Discalced Carmelites came from Bavaria at the invitation of Archbishop Sebastian Messmer, and the Shrine of Mary was put under their care on June 26, 1906. The building now known as the Old Monastery Inn and Retreat Center was completed in 1920. The second shrine was removed in 1925 so that a third shrine could be built. The cornerstone of the third and present shrine was placed by Archbishop Messmer on August 22, 1926. The present church was completed and consecrated in 1931.

Another tradition describes a German priest who was recreant to his vows and came to America for penance. He found a reference to the hill in Marquette's diary and decided to take a pilgrimage. He became ill in Chicago, and was paralyzed. He reportedly found the hill, crawled to the summit on his hands, and was cured of his paralysis.

Worship site
The basilica hosts weekend Masses. There are also daily religious services and Marian devotions.

The main church was built in 1930. At its entrance, It has two eight-foot-tall statues which were placed there in 1958. The statue on the left depicts St. Mary, Help of Christians; and the one on the right depicts Saint Joseph, protector of the Carmelites. The inside of the church features mosaics of Discalced Carmelite founders St. Teresa of Jesus and St. John of the Cross.

Repairs
The church underwent a $6.1-million renovation between 2002 and 2006. The renovations included extensive interior decorative painting, faux stone & mosaic by Conrad Schmitt Studios and exterior repairs, including a new slate roof for the monastery, main church and bell tower.

On June 6, 2006 (06/06/06), vandals spray-painted the church and several shrines with expletives and references to Satan and the Number of the Beast. It was later discovered the vandals were two teenage boys. The cost of removing the graffiti was in excess of $33,000.

On May 26, 2013, four new cast-bronze entry doors were dedicated by His Excellency, Archbishop Jerome E. Listecki.  The doors were designed by architect Duncan G. Stroik and contain scenes sculpted by artist Cody Swanson.  The scenes depict Saint Theresa of Ávila, The Annunciation with Gabriel the Archangel and Our Lady, and Saint John of the Cross.

Milestones
The shrine is listed on the National Register of Historic Places. On July 16, 2006, a Mass was held celebrating 100 years of Carmelite stewardship at the site. During that Mass it was announced that Pope Benedict XVI (the reigning pope at the time) had named Holy Hill a minor basilica.
Holy Hill was dedicated as a minor basilica by Archbishop Timothy Dolan on November 19, 2006. There are about 85 minor basilicas in the United States.

New York Cardinal Timothy Dolan drew a large crowd of Catholics and well-wishers to Holy Hill on April 28, 2012, for a special Mass of Thanksgiving, some arriving as early as 4:30 a.m. to ensure a spot in the historic Basilica of the National Shrine of Mary Help of Christians.

Climate

See also

List of churches in the Roman Catholic Archdiocese of Milwaukee
List of shrines#United States
Kettle Moraine Scenic Drive

References

Further reading
 Kearns, Mary. Holy Hill: Its History. Discalced Carmelite Fathers, 1987.

External links

Holy Hill
Frank E Larscheid's ecclesiastical works
2003 Milwaukee Journal Sentinel Article

Shrines to the Virgin Mary
Roman Catholic national shrines in the United States
Basilica churches in Wisconsin
Churches in the Roman Catholic Archdiocese of Milwaukee
Landmarks in Wisconsin
Churches on the National Register of Historic Places in Wisconsin
Churches in Washington County, Wisconsin
Tourist attractions in Washington County, Wisconsin
Historic districts on the National Register of Historic Places in Wisconsin
1862 establishments in Wisconsin
National Register of Historic Places in Washington County, Wisconsin